Big Night is the ninth studio album released by British-Australian singer-songwriter Peter Andre. The album was released on 26 May 2014, and was preceded by the lead single, "Kid".

Background
Andre wanted to take another musical direction with this swing music album. Peter co-wrote all 11 songs with singer-songwriter Stevie Appleton. In February 2014, he released the first song off this album, "Kid", which was chosen for the DreamWorks animated movie Mr. Peabody & Sherman.  Kid was also used in the Autumn Iceland TV commercials.

Critical reception

Carys Jones wrote for Entertainment-Focus that Big Night was "a really great effort from Peter Andre and [was] probably the best album that he [had] ever released" and Janelle Tucknott of RenownedForSound.com claimed that "leaping into the Big Band/Swing/Soul/Blues direction of Big Night [was] a risk which [had] paid off nicely for Peter Andre".

Track listing

Charts

References

Peter Andre albums
2014 albums